Amphilius korupi is a species of catfish in the genus Amphilius. It is found in coastal streams in northwestern Cameroon. Its length reaches 6.5 cm.

References 

Fish described in 2007
Freshwater fish of West Africa
korupi